Seymchan Airport  is an airport in Magadan Oblast, Russia located two kilometers southeast of Seymchan.

The runway is well-maintained.  The facility is marked as military on some US DoD charts.

Airlines and Destinations

Commercial trips by helicopter are made from this airport to arranged destinations in the wilderness, for example, for hunters.

History
Seymchan Airport connected Zyryanka West Airport (UESU) to Oymyakon on the ALSIB Alaska-Siberian air route during the World War II Lend-Lease program.

Incidents and accidents
Commercial flights from Seymchan to nearby remote areas using the local forest fire protection service's Mi-8 helicopters are routine.

On 15 September 2007 one such flight crashed on the Suruktash mountain while on its way to deliver paying passengers to the vicinity of the Burgali river. 6 people died, and one, the craft's commander, survived with severe burns. The wreck and the survivor were spotted by another Mi-8, and the victim was flown to Seymchan for transport to a hospital.

References

Soviet Air Force bases
Airports built in the Soviet Union
Airports in Magadan Oblast
Cultural heritage monuments in Magadan Oblast
Objects of cultural heritage of Russia of regional significance